Washington Township is one of the seventeen townships of Stark County, Ohio, United States.  The 2000 census found 4,791 people in the township.

Geography
Located in the eastern part of the county, it borders the following townships and city:
Lexington Township - north
Alliance - northeast
Knox Township, Columbiana County - east
West Township, Columbiana County - southeast corner
Paris Township - south
Nimishillen Township - west
Marlboro Township - northwest

Part of the city of Alliance is located in northern Washington Township, with the unincorporated communities of Maximo in the eastern part of the township and Freeburg near OH-153 in the southern part of the township.

Name and history
It is one of forty-three Washington Townships statewide.

In 1833, Washington Township contained one gristmill, three saw mills, and one tannery.

Government
The township is governed by a three-member board of trustees, who are elected in November of odd-numbered years to a four-year term beginning on the following January 1. Two are elected in the year after the presidential election and one is elected in the year before it. There is also an elected township fiscal officer, who serves a four-year term beginning on April 1 of the year after the election, which is held in November of the year before the presidential election. Vacancies in the fiscal officership or on the board of trustees are filled by the remaining trustees.

References

External links
County website

Townships in Stark County, Ohio
Townships in Ohio